The 9:30 Club (originally named Nightclub 9:30, also known simply as the 9:30) is a nightclub and concert venue in Washington, D.C. In 2018, the 9:30 Club was named one of the 10 best live music venues in America by Rolling Stone, and in 2019 the club was named "Venue of the Decade" by VenuesNow.

The club was originally housed in the ground floor rear room of the Atlantic Building at 930 F Street NW, in the city's downtown area, where it opened on May 31, 1980, with a legal standing capacity of 199. In 1996, the club was moved to a roomier space: its current location at 815 V Street NW, where it anchors the eastern end of the U Street Corridor.

The 9:30 Club's name was derived from its original street address, which was also the reason to set the venue's original opening time of 9:30 p.m. Early advertising on D.C.'s WHFS radio featured the slogan "9:30 – a Place and Time!"

The club has a distinctive wheeled stage mounted on rails, which can be moved back and forth as needed. This way, the place can feel as packed with 500 people in attendance as it would during a sold-out, full capacity show.

Fall Out Boy's Patrick Stump once said of the 9:30, "it's got so much character, you wonder if the locals know how lucky they are."

History

Nightclub 9:30 

Nightclub 9:30 was founded by artist and dancer Dody DiSanto and her husband, Jon Bowers, a local real estate developer and music enthusiast who had just purchased the Atlantic Building in 1979. The Atlantic Building was full of artists even before it became the 9:30 club. The venue hosted its first show on May 31, 1980, featuring New York-based jazz-punk outfit the Lounge Lizards as headliners, and local new wave band Tiny Desk Unit as the opening act. New York's The Fleshtones were the first band ever to be booked at the club.

Since its origins, Nightclub 9:30, which allowed fans as young as sixteen to enter, was known as a progressive venue noted for its talent in discovering up-and-coming acts. During the early 1980s, it was the home for alternative music in D.C., just as the genre was beginning to blossom. By that point, the club was based around local bands, mainly from the punk, hardcore, and go-go scenes; D.C.-area acts such as Minor Threat (played there in '83), Fugazi (also played there in '94), Government Issue, Iron Cross, the Slickee Boys, Urban Verbs, Chuck Brown ("The Godfather of Go-Go") in '05, Maiesha and the Hip Huggers featuring E.U., Root Boy Slim and the Sex Change Band, Rites of Spring played in 1985, and Dain Bramage, whose teenage drummer, Dave Grohl, went on to become part of Nirvana and to found the Foo Fighters. (The Foo Fighters also played there in '99.) James Blood Ulmer played there in 1982.

However, in a very short time, the venue also became a regular stopping point for punk and new wave bands touring the East Coast. Some of the most notable performers in the early days of Nightclub 9:30 were Black Flag, the Bad Brains from D.C. (also played there in '92), the Red Hot Chili Peppers, the Psychedelic Furs, Einstürzende Neubauten, the Ramones, X, Blue Angel (with lead singer Cyndi Lauper), the Bangles, R.E.M., Hüsker Dü, Erasure, Richard Hell and the Voidoids, the Violent Femmes, the Butthole Surfers, That Petrol Emotion, the Replacements, Marti Jones, Marshall Crenshaw, Mod Fun, Nash the Slash, the Go-Go's, and BETTY, whose bassist and co-vocalist, Alyson Palmer, tended bar in the club at the time.

On May 21, 1981, Washington music programmer and writer Tom Terrell was instrumental in masterminding the U.S. premiere of reggae band Steel Pulse on the night of Bob Marley's funeral, which was broadcast live worldwide from Nightclub 9:30.

In 1986, after six years of operating the club, Bowers and DiSanto sold it to Seth Hurwitz and Richard Heinecke of It's My Party (I.M.P.), the Maryland-based concert promotion company they co-own.

Over the following years, as the club's prominence and lineup were growing, the need for a bigger space was becoming increasingly evident. In preparation for the move, the owners purchased and extensively renovated the former WUST Radio Music Hall at 815 V Street.

The old Nightclub 9:30 closed its doors on December 31, 1995. The club's final shows at the original location were memorialized on a two-CD set released in 1997 and entitled 9:30 Live – A Time, A Place, A Scene. This live CD, recorded between December 28, 1995, and January 1, 1996, includes local music from the Urban Verbs, Tiny Desk Unit, Mother May I, The Insect Surfers, Tru Fax and the Insaniacs, and Black Market Baby.

9:30 Club 

Before the reopening, the club owners organized a "christening" show for media and friends featuring the Fleshtones and Too Much Joy. On January 5, 1996, the new 9:30 Club opened to the public with a show that included the Smashing Pumpkins.

NPR's online music show All Songs Considered broadcast some concerts at the venue. There is an archive of these shows.

D.C. acts that played at the 9:30 Club include:  Good Charlotte and Vertical Horizon in 2004, Joan Jett (who lived in Maryland) in 2006, Mýa in 2007, Wale in 2010, and SHAED in 2019.

Significant moments 

Popular local band Emmet Swimming played one of the first shows at the new 9:30 on a snowy night and recorded part of their live concert CD Earplugs 50¢ at the venue.

Bob Dylan played shows on December 4 and 5, 1997, when he was in Washington, D.C., to receive the Kennedy Center Honors. Dylan returned for an unannounced show on April 2, 2004, before scheduled dates at the Bender Arena and the Warner Theatre.

On June 12, 1998, the Red Hot Chili Peppers performed a surprise eleven-song set at the club. Money Mark and the Propellerheads were the opening acts. The show, which was the band's first at the new venue (they had previously performed at the old 9:30 Club five times from 1985 to 1987), was their first public performance since reuniting with guitarist John Frusciante, who had quit the band in 1992; although the band had performed a short in-studio acoustic set of mostly cover songs a week early for a radio show in Los Angeles. The 9:30 Club show was seen as a warm-up for their performance the next day at the Tibetan Freedom Concert, which was held at the RFK Stadium in Washington, D.C.; when bad weather cancelled their set at the concert, Pearl Jam shortened their own set so the Chili Peppers could perform a few songs.

O.A.R., whose members grew up in nearby Rockville, Maryland, recorded the live album Any Time Now at the 9:30 Club on November 23 and 24, 2001. The venue also hosted the band's first four shows on their 2012 Extended Stay tour.

Gorillaz performed their 2nd concert in the U.S.A. ever at The 9:30 Club on February 26, 2002 (their 1st in the U.S.A. being in Boston, Massachusetts at Avalon Ballroom on 25 February 2002); which also served as their 3rd concert in North America ever (their first being in Toronto, Ontario, Canada at the Toronto Docks on 23 February 2002) as well as their 13th live concert overall (having already performed twice in London, England and once in Liverpool, England; Birmingham, England; Manchester, England; Edinburgh, Scotland; Dublin, Ireland; Paris, France; Osaka, Japan; & Tokyo, Japan between 22 March 2001 and 28 September 2001).

On June 2 and 3, 2002, Arizona band Jimmy Eat World recorded their live DVD Believe in What You Want at the nightclub, following the release of their album Bleed American. The video was released on November 26, 2002.

In 2003, local band the Pietasters released their first live video DVD, Live at The 9:30 Club.

The Beastie Boys performed at the club on June 17, 2004, after a five-year hiatus. This was a radio event sponsored by WHFS 99.1 FM, which gave away all the tickets for the event to listeners. A  thunderstorm delayed the band's travel from New York City.  About 8:30 p.m., Radio DJs the Junkies and Tim Virgin read a statement from the Beastie Boys explaining the situation, noting that they were on the train, and saying the show would go on at about 11:15 p.m. The crowd was disappointed, but the club relaxed its re-admittance policy and allowed everyone to leave and have dinner if they so desired. To further ease crowd tensions, the Beastie Boys' management had pizzas delivered to the club for fans. Mix Master Mike took the stage at 11:13 p.m. to warm up the crowd. The Beastie Boys came out minutes later on stage in front of a packed house. Posters of this late 9:30 Club performance are in the Beastie Boys' video "Triple Trouble", pasted on the walls of the streets the group walk through at 2:13.

The Smashing Pumpkins celebrated the release of Zeitgeist, their first album in seven years, at the 9:30 Club on July 10, 2007. The event was depicted in the band's 2008 DVD documentary, If All Goes Wrong.

Radiohead played a secret show at the venue on June 13, 1998, in which, Michael Stipe of R.E.M. fame sang with the band on one of their hits. They decided to play this show because their appearance at the Tibetan Freedom Concert held at the RFK Stadium was delayed to the next day due to bad weather. Additionally, the Beastie Boys, Ed Kowalczyk of Live, Brad Pitt, Jennifer Aniston, Dave Grohl of The Foo Fighters attended as part of the crowd.

Bob Mould performed at the club on October 7, 2005, and released a subsequent DVD of the concert called Circle of Friends.

On November 24, 2007, Hawthorne Heights guitarist and screamer Casey Calvert was found dead of a drug overdose on their tour bus, which was parked outside the club.

In September 2009, the newly reunited Alice in Chains kicked off their U.S. tour at the 9:30 Club with new singer William DuVall.

On December 28, 2009, Clutch recorded their DVD Live at the 9:30, performing their self-titled album, Clutch, in its entirety.

In May 2010, the legendary reggae band Steel Pulse performed their charity song "Hold On for Haiti" for the first time. All proceeds from the song go to nonprofit organizations Solar Electric Light Fund and Partners In Health, to solar electrify health clinics in Haiti.

On May 31, 2010, the 9:30 Club celebrated its 30th anniversary with a lineup stretching its history, including Tiny Desk Unit, The Fleshtones, Tommy Keene, The Slickee Boys, The Psychedelic Furs, Marti Jones and Don Dixon, Clutch, Trouble Funk, The Evens, Justin Jones, The Pietasters, Pete Stahl, Ted Leo, Bob Mould, and Dave Grohl. The event was hosted by Henry Rollins.

In June 2010, Courtney Love and the newly reformed Hole performed a disastrous set described by The Washington Post as a three-hour epic train wreck. A barely coherent Love stumbled, complained and stripped through an entire set composed mostly of incomplete versions of the band's songs. Most members of the audience left before the set ended.

On July 30, 2010, house music producer deadmau5 collapsed on stage in the middle of a set and was rushed to the hospital. He had been suffering from exhaustion and vomiting. This collapse led to the cancellation of the nine shows which followed the event.

On May 12, 2011, Adele performed at the venue as part of her Adele Live tour. She sold out the venue in less than two minutes, and the show grossed $45,000. Back in 2009, she also performed her debut concert tour An Evening with Adele on January 17.

On February 24, 2012, the Soul Rebels Brass Band were the subject of an NPR national broadcast of their show with Galactic live from the 9:30 Club. The broadcast was syndicated on NPR and through other affiliates across the United States, as well as webcast on NPR.org.

On September 25, 2012, Adam Lambert headlined a benefit hosted by Marylanders for Marriage Equality, a group working to garner support for the state's ballot-proposition to legislate marriage equality.

On June 12, 2013, Animal Collective performed a set of songs previously released on their LPs and EPs. The show was documented on the album Live at 9:30.

In 2013, hardcore punk supergroup, Off!, released the limited edition vinyl album, Live at 9:30 Club, which featured their performance from June 25, 2011.

The Pixies performed a surprise show on May 31, 2015, after their appearance at the Sweetlife Festival the day before.

In January 2016, 9:30 celebrated its 35th birthday by opening its doors for an interactive exhibition detailing the club's vast history, the "9:30 World's Fair". This exhibition highlighted the pieces of the old 930 F St. location that made the trip to 815 V St., while taking dedicated fans through a tour of the venue like it had never been seen before, including a look inside the dressing rooms and a peek at the hair dryer purchased specifically for James Brown.

On January 27, 2016, Jack's Mannequin returned to the road to honor the 10-year anniversary of the album Everything in Transit. Playing just weeks after the death of David Bowie, Andrew McMahon also performed an acoustic rendition of “Life on Mars”.

In March 2016, At the Drive-In's reunion tour was cut short after night one of two at the club, when singer Cedric Bixler lost his voice due to illness.

On June 6, 2016, Tom Petty's pre-Heartbreakers band Mudcrutch performed at the club on its very first tour despite being founded three decades earlier. While not performing any Heartbreaker's hits, their set included the traditional song "Shady Grove" (perhaps as a nod to the DC Metro Station), and a cover of Bob Dylan's "Knockin' on Heaven's Door".

On August 24, 2016, ZZ Top performed for a sold-out audience, the "Surprise! At the Club!" performance having only been announced two weeks prior. Jonny "2 Bags" Wickersham of Social Distortion opened the show, which saw ZZ performing all of their classic hits before concluding with a cover of Elvis Presley's "Jailhouse Rock".

In support of Wild World, Bastille sold out the club in minutes for their show on October 2, 2016, just months before playing EagleBank Arena.

The very next day, October 3, 2016, was another "Surprise! At the Club!": Green Day, in preparation for their international Revolution Radio Tour. An inside look at what the show meant to some of their fans can be seen in Episode 12 of Live at 9:30.

December 14, 2016 saw Jimmy Eat World return to 9:30 for another "Surprise! At the Club!"

On January 14, 2017, 9:30 opened its doors to celebrate the life and music of Urban Verbs' guitarist and NPR music librarian Robert Goldstein, with tribute performances including The Slickee Boys and Martha Hull & The 7 Door Sedan.

Later that month, the 9:30 Club partnered with Planned Parenthood for two shows. The first, a free event titled "Show Up!", took place on January 19, 2017 featuring Common and The National. The second was the official 2017 Women's March after-party/benefit show hosted by Funny or Die on January 21, 2017, titled "Laugh, Dance... then Get to Work!" Special guests at this performance included Senators Al Franken and Cory Booker, Sleater-Kinney, Sara Bareilles, Sam Harris of X Ambassadors, Ted Leo, Dirty Projectors' David Longstreth, The National, Ani DiFranco, Samantha Ronson, Macklemore, Tig Notaro, Janeane Garofalo, Lizzy Caplan, Ashley Judd, Rosario Dawson, Eric Andre, Michelle Rodriguez, Cameron Esposito and River Butcher, Ronna and Beverly, Casey Wilson, June Diane Raphael, and Morgan Walsh.

Four days after the 59th Annual Grammy Awards, Maren Morris performed her first live show as a Grammy winner to a sold-out crowd at the 9:30 Club.

Valentines Day 2017 was celebrated with Rick Astley, performing a number of popular covers in addition to songs from his newest album, 50, and the classic "Never Gonna Give You Up".

March 5 and 6, 2017 presented another "Surprise! At the Club!" with two nights of The Flaming Lips, hamster ball and all.

On August 19, 2017, 9:30 opened its doors to celebrate the life and art of prolific graffiti icon Cool "Disco" Dan, with performances from DJ Flexx, the Howard University Choir, and legendary go-go band Rare Essence, as well as an appearance by Mayor Muriel Bowser proclaiming August 19 "Cool 'Disco' Dan Day".

Pop culture references 
The 9:30 Club was mentioned in the Gilmore Girls final season when Lane books a gig with her band Hep Alien.

In Designated Survivor, Aaron invites Emily to a date at the 9:30 Club.

While filming A.P. Bio, comedian Patton Oswalt ad-libbed a rant about ska music featuring a story about the 9:30 Club, The Pietasters, No Doubt, Madness and more.

The cupcake 

During Cake's two-night run on May 30 and 31 in 2009 (the club's 29th birthday), the 9:30 Club introduced the official 9:30 Cupcake, made by Buzz Bakeshop of Alexandria, Virginia.

The 9:30 Cupcake is a devil's food cupcake with a butter-cream center, chocolate frosting, and chocolate ganache, with the club's italicized 9:30 logo scrawled on top in white icing. The cupcakes are made fresh by the bakery and delivered to the club each morning, and are available for fans as well as musicians.

The 9:30 Hall of Records 

Built for the 35th Anniversary "World's Fair" events and left as a growing monument to the club's history, the new Hall of Records documents every headlining performance to occur at the 9:30 Club since its inception in 1980. Catalogued in album form, the collection includes nearly 8,000 vinyl and CDs.

In Print: 9:30 - A Time and a Place 
Accompanying the "World's Fair" was the release of the "9:30 – A Time and A Place" oral & pictorial history book, featuring 265 pages of behind-the-scenes photographs and a plethora of stories from the venue's past told by staff and artists alike, from Public Enemy's Chuck D to Sarah McLachlan.

On TV: Live at 9:30 
In February 2016, it was announced that the 9:30 Club had partnered with Squarespace, Shinola, and Destination DC to produce a new musically-centered variety show for PBS, featuring five acts per episode alongside a variety of comedy and short films. Artists include: Garbage, The Arcs, Tove Lo, Andrew McMahon in the Wilderness, Grace Potter, Trouble Funk, Troye Sivan, Frank Turner, Cold War Kids, and many more.

Live at 9:30 debuted in May, with a mix of contributors and hosts including Henry Rollins, NPR Music's Bob Boilen, Hannibal Buress, Jill Kargman, Ralphie May and Tony Rock.

While episodes are airing across the country, they are also available on www.liveat930.com.

Awards 
The 9:30 Club has been awarded "Nightclub of the Year" by Pollstar 13 times (more than any other club in Pollstar's history), including 5 years in a row from 2012 to 2016.

For much of that time, it has regularly topped that concert industry trade journal's annual list of the top ticket-selling clubs in the United States. In 2014, the 9:30 Club sold 284,309 tickets, the second most for a nightclub worldwide.

The venue won the Top Club awards at the 2007 through 2012 Billboard Touring Awards, except in 2008, when the award was not presented.

Touring artists and managers in conjunction with Rolling Stone rated the club the No. 1 Big Room in America.

In 2019, VenuesNow named the 9:30 Club "Venue of the Decade."

References

External links 

 

Articles
 Du Lac, J. Freedom; et al. (April 18, 2010). "Misfits, new wave icons and giant rats: A history of D.C.'s 9:30 Club" (interactive multimedia article). Washington Post Magazine.
 Du Lac, J. Freedom. (April 18, 2010). "Misfits, new wave icons and giant rats: A history of D.C.'s 9:30 Club" (text-only article, page 1/5). Washington Post Magazine.
 Tom (September 4, 2012). "Three Shows at the 9:30 Club". Ghosts of DC
 Fame-ish (July 8, 2013). "HiddenDC: Loitering Outside the 9:30". FamousDC
 Bray, Ryan; Comaratta, Len. (May 18, 2014). "An oral history of DC’s 9:30 Club: As told by Ian MacKaye, Henry Rollins, Bob Mould, and many others" (page 1/4). Consequence of Sound.
 Kiger, Patrick. (November 11, 2014). "The Epicenter of the 1980s Alternative Music Scene in DC". Boundary Stones.
 Destination DC (2016). "Meet Me at 9:30". Destination DC.
 DePompa, Mary (January 12, 2016). "The 9:30 Club: A time and a place". WTOP.

Images
 Historical 1969 photo of building exterior as WUST Radio, prior to becoming nightclub from John in Montana.
 Historical 1986 photos of building exterior as WUST Radio, prior to becoming nightclub from Flickr.

Nightclubs in Washington, D.C.
Music venues in Washington, D.C.
1980 establishments in Washington, D.C.